Arthur Rose (also found as Ross; 1634–1704) was a Scottish minister, Archbishop of St Andrews, and, informally, the first Episcopal Primate of Scotland, after the fall of the Restoration Episcopate in 1689.

Life
The younger son of Elizabeth Wood and her husband, John Rose, minister of Birse, he was born in 1634. Graduating from Marischal College on 9 July 1652, he chose to follow his father's church career, and on 5 April 1655, he received his licence from the presbytery of Garioch, obtaining the parish of Kinearny in the following year.

Rose's position in the church improved when he was moved to the nearby parish of Old Deer in Autumn 1663. In the following year he became rector of Marischal College, his alma mater, and later in the same year was given control of St Mungo's, Glasgow, after being persuaded by Alexander Burnet, then Archbishop of Glasgow. In 1675 he became Bishop of Argyll, while retaining control of the St Mungo's parsonage. On 5 September 1679, he was translated to the diocese of Galloway, having been elected as Bishop of Galloway earlier in the year.

However, Rose was not to be Bishop of Galloway for long, for in October of the same year he succeeded Burnet as Archbishop of Glasgow. Five years later he succeeded Alexander Burnet again, this time after the latter's death rather than promotion. Rose was formally installed as Archbishop of St Andrews and Primate of Scotland on 25 December 1684. Rose was Archbishop until on 22 July 1689, when parliament abolished all prelates in Scotland. He continued discreetly as an Episcopalian, remaining informally the primate until his death on 13 June 1704. He died at Campbell's Close in Canongate, Edinburgh, and was buried in the graveyard of the church of Restalrig.

References
 Clarke, Tristram, "Ross , Arthur (1634–1704)", in the Oxford Dictionary of National Biography, Oxford University Press, 2004 , retrieved 1 May 2007
 Keith, Robert, An Historical Catalogue of the Scottish Bishops: Down to the Year 1688, (London, 1824)

1634 births
1704 deaths
Roman Catholic archbishops of Glasgow
Archbishops of St Andrews
Bishops of Argyll
Bishops of Galloway (Church of Scotland)
Chancellors of the University of Glasgow
Chancellors of the University of St Andrews
Rectors of the University of Aberdeen
Scottish Restoration bishops
Alumni of the University of Aberdeen
Members of the Convention of the Estates of Scotland 1678
Members of the Parliament of Scotland 1681–1682
Members of the Parliament of Scotland 1685–1686
Members of the Convention of the Estates of Scotland 1689